The Vagabond Prince is a 1916 silent film directed by Charles Giblyn and starring H. B. Warner and Dorothy Dalton. It was produced by Thomas H. Ince and distributed by Triangle.

Cast
H. B. Warner - Prince Torio
Dorothy Dalton - Lola "Fluffy"
Roy Laidlaw - Burton Randall
Katherine Kirkwood - Princess Athalia
Charles K. French - "Spud" Murphy
James McLaughlin - "Red" Kelly (J.W. McLaughlin)
J. Frank Burke - Count Sergis Metropolski
Aggie Herring - Mrs. Finnegan

Preservation status
The film survives and is on DVD.

References

External links
The Vagabond Prince at IMDb.com

1916 films
American silent feature films
American black-and-white films
Films directed by Charles Giblyn
Triangle Film Corporation films
Silent American drama films
1916 drama films
1910s American films